Jeffrey Brian Lebo (born October 5, 1966) is an American basketball coach and former player who is an assistant coach for his alma mater, North Carolina. He was previously the head men's basketball coach at East Carolina (2010-2017), Auburn University (2004–2010), the University of Tennessee at Chattanooga (2002–04), and Tennessee Tech (1998–2002). Before becoming a head coach, he spent a total of eight years as an assistant coach at South Carolina, Vanderbilt, and East Tennessee State. He also spent a season as an assistant with the Greensboro Swarm of the NBA G League.

Lebo was born in Carlisle, Pennsylvania.  As a high school player, he played for his father, Dave Lebo, at Carlisle High School, where he was a McDonald's All-American. The elder Lebo would later serve as an assistant to his son, at Auburn. As a collegian, Lebo was a 4-year starter (1986–1989) while playing for legendary coach Dean Smith at the University of North Carolina. While at Carolina, Lebo set the Tar Heel record for most consecutive free throws made (41 from January 3 to March 12, 1989), the most assists in a single game (17 vs. Chattanooga on November 18, 1988) and (at the time) had the highest career free throw shooting percentage (.839) in Tar Heel history (currently fifth all time) and was third in Tar Heel history with 580 assists (currently tenth all time). Lebo was also an Academic All American and graduated in 1989 with a degree in Business Administration. After leaving the Tar Heels, Lebo had a brief NBA career as a member of the San Antonio Spurs during the 1989-90 season, appearing in four games.

On March 12, 2010, following a loss to Florida in the 2010 SEC men's basketball tournament in Nashville, Lebo was fired as the head basketball coach at Auburn after compiling a 96-93 record in six years as coach of the Tigers to go along with no post-season NCAA tournament bids.

On March 22, 2010, Lebo was named head coach at East Carolina University. During his first year in Greenville, Lebo led the ECU Pirates basketball team to 18 wins, their first winning season since 1997, and a spot in the 2011 CollegeInsider.com Tournament which was the first post-season appearance by the Pirates since the 1993 NCAA Tournament. The 18 wins were the second most wins ever by the ECU Pirates since becoming a Division I basketball team. During his third year at ECU, Lebo again led the Pirates to the CIT Tournament. The Pirates defeated Weber State and won the 2013 CollegeInsider.com Postseason Tournament Championship that year. On November 29, 2017, Lebo announced his resignation as the ECU Basketball Coach. He posted a 116-122 mark during his tenure at ECU.

On April 15, 2021, after former teammate Hubert Davis' hiring as the North Carolina head coach, Lebo was named as one of the three assistants for Davis' inaugural coaching staff, alongside former Tar Heel players Brad Frederick and Sean May.

Head coaching record

*Lebo underwent hip surgery on January 16, 2017 and missed the rest of the 2016–17 season. Assistant coach Michael Perry took over as head coach in Lebo's absence. At the time of Lebo's absence, ECU was 9–10 overall and 1–5 in AAC play.**Lebo resigned on November 29, 2017.

References

External links
East Carolina Pirates bio
Auburn Tigers bio
NBA stats @ basketballreference.com

1966 births
Living people
American men's basketball players
Auburn Tigers men's basketball coaches
Basketball coaches from Pennsylvania
Basketball players at the 1987 Pan American Games
Basketball players from Pennsylvania
Chattanooga Mocs men's basketball coaches
College men's basketball head coaches in the United States
East Carolina Pirates men's basketball coaches
East Tennessee State Buccaneers men's basketball coaches
Greensboro Swarm coaches
McDonald's High School All-Americans
Medalists at the 1987 Pan American Games
North Carolina Tar Heels men's basketball coaches
North Carolina Tar Heels men's basketball players
Pan American Games medalists in basketball
Pan American Games silver medalists for the United States
Parade High School All-Americans (boys' basketball)
People from Carlisle, Pennsylvania
San Antonio Spurs players
Shooting guards
South Carolina Gamecocks men's basketball coaches
Tennessee Tech Golden Eagles men's basketball coaches
Undrafted National Basketball Association players
Vanderbilt Commodores men's basketball coaches